is Perfume's 3rd major-label single. The single is produced by capsule member Yasutaka Nakata. It was released in a CD-only version and its catalog number is TKCA-73017. An official remix by Soichi Terada, titled "Electro World(relaxation mix)", is also available.

Track listing
 
 "wonder2"

Cover
Electro World was covered by Japanese noise band Hijokaidan's sub-project Hatsune Kaidan with vocals from vocaloid character Hatsune Miku as the second track on the album Noisy Killer.

2006 songs
Perfume (Japanese band) songs
Songs written by Yasutaka Nakata
Song recordings produced by Yasutaka Nakata